Pamela Graboski Beidle (born July 21, 1951) is an American politician from Maryland and a member of the Democratic Party. She was elected in 2006, and reelected in 2010 and 2014 to the Maryland House of Delegates, representing Maryland's District 32 in Anne Arundel County. She is currently a member of the Maryland Senate and serves of the Finance Committee. Prior to her election in the Maryland House of Delegates, she served two terms as a County Council Member for the 1st District of Anne Arundel County. She is also the President of Beidle Insurance Agency located in Glen Burnie, Maryland and Hanover, Maryland. Beidle also serves as a bank director with the Arundel Federal Savings Bank.

As a member of the House of Delegates, Delegate Beidle serves on the Environmental Matters committee, serving on the
Environment, Housing and Real Property, and the Bi-County and Local Government sub-committees.

Beidle is a graduate of Archbishop Spalding High School, 1969,  Anne Arundel Community College, 1977 and Towson State University,
1994. Pamela and her husband, Len live in Linthicum, Maryland. They have three grown children, Nicholas, Nathan, and Lyndsey. They also have seven grandchildren: Aurora, Paxton, Zachary, Kalilah, Madison, Hadley, and Quinn.

Legislative history
 voted for the Maryland Gang Prosecution Act of 2007 (HB713), subjecting gang members to up to 20 years in prison and/or a fine of up to $100,000
 voted for Jessica’s Law (HB 930), eliminating parole for the most violent child sexual predators and creating a mandatory minimum sentence of 25 years in state prison, 2007
 voted for Public Safety – Statewide DNA Database System – Crimes of Violence and Burglary – Post conviction (HB 370), helping to give police officers and prosecutors greater resources to solve crimes and eliminating a backlog of 24,000 unanalyzed DNA samples, leading to 192 arrests, 2008
 voted for Vehicle Laws – Repeated Drunk and Drugged Driving Offenses – Suspension of License (HB 293), strengthening Maryland’s drunk driving laws by imposing a mandatory one year license suspension for a person convicted of drunk driving more than once in five years, 2009
 voted for HB 102, creating the House Emergency Medical Services System Workgroup, leading to Maryland’s budgeting of $52 million to fund three new Medevac helicopters to replace the State’s aging fleet, 2009

For the past four years, Delegate Beidle has annually voted to support classroom teachers, public schools, police and hospitals in Anne Arundel County. Since 2002, funding to schools across the State has increased 82%, resulting in Maryland being ranked top in the nation for K-12 education.

References

External links

Democratic Party Maryland state senators
Living people
Women state legislators in Maryland
1951 births
Towson University alumni
Members of Anne Arundel County Council
People from Linthicum, Maryland
21st-century American politicians
21st-century American women politicians